The Wasigny–Renneville/Berlise railway was a  long metre gauge railway in the north of France, which was commissioned in 1909 and operated until 1948.

History 
The secondary railway line of the Chemins de fer départementaux des Ardennes ran from Wasigny to Renneville/Berlise with a gauge of 1000 mm. A 1 km section of the line was in the département of Aisne. The railway was opened in 1909 and operated until 1948.

Stations

References 

Railway lines in Grand Est
Metre gauge railways in France
Chemins de fer départementaux des Ardennes